World Class Leader Board is a 1987 video game published by Access Software. It is part of the Leader Board series.

Gameplay
World Class Leader Board is a game in which the courses include St. Andrews, Doral and Cypress Creek, and a fourth fictional one called Gauntlet.

Reception
Rick Teverbaugh reviewed the game for Computer Gaming World, and stated that "WCLB is a son that follows right in the footsteps of the father. The game play is smooth."

David M. Wilson and Johnny L. Wilson reviewed the game for Computer Gaming World, and stated that "WCLB does not show the player how much force is being applied on the power graph. Instead, the professional player is expected to have an intuitive grasp of the extent of his stroke. This is a very challenging facet of the game."

Reviews
Mean Machines - May, 1991
The Games Machine - Aug, 1990
Computer and Video Games - May, 1992
Your Sinclair - Jan, 1988
Sega Power - Dec, 1993

References

External links
Review in Compute!
Review in Info
Article in Drean Commodore (Spanish)
Article in The Australian Commodore and Amiga Review
Review in Macworld
Review in Computer Play
Review in Video Games & Computer Entertainment
Review in Video Games (German)
Review in Sega Visions
Review in Atari ST User
Review in Videogame & Computer World (Italian)
Review in Amiga World
Review in Hobby Consolas (Spanish)

1987 video games
Acorn Archimedes games
Amiga games
Amstrad CPC games
Apple II games
Atari ST games
Classic Mac OS games
Commodore 64 games
Game Gear games
Golf video games
IOS games
Master System games
Sega Genesis games
Tiertex Design Studios games
U.S. Gold games
Video games developed in the United States
ZX Spectrum games